USS Marl (IX-160), a   designated an unclassified miscellaneous vessel, was the only ship of the United States Navy to be named for marl.  Her keel was laid down under Maritime Commission contract (T. B7.D1) by Barrett & Hilp, Belair Shipyard, South San Francisco, California, on 16 November 1943. She was launched on 2 February 1944 sponsored by Mrs. J. M. Ryan, converted for Navy use as a cargo barge, acquired by the Navy under loan charter from the Maritime Commission on 29 August 1944; and placed in service at San Francisco the same day.

Service history
Assigned to duty with Service Squadron 8, Marl was towed to the Philippines where during the remainder of the war in the Pacific she provided facilities for storing and issuing United States Army and United States Marine Corps supplies at Leyte. A vicious typhoon dispersed the convoy north of the Philippines on 29 September, and mountainous seas parted Marl from her towline early the next day. She was recovered following the storm and towed to Subic Bay on 7 October. She underwent repairs to damaged machinery and continued duty as cargo stores barge until 2 August 1946 when she was placed out of service and delivered to War Shipping Administration. Her name was struck from the Naval Vessel Register on 15 August 1946. Marl was sold by the Maritime Commission to the Asia Development Corporation on 4 September 1948.

References

External links
Photo gallery at navsource.org

 

Trefoil-class concrete barges
Ships built in the San Francisco Bay Area
1944 ships